SV Kaltern is an ice hockey team in Kaltern, Italy. They play in the Serie A, the first level of ice hockey in Italy. The club was founded in 1962. Currently the team holds tryouts for any hopefuls from  the 28 of May to June 7 each year, in Florence.

Honours
Serie A2 champion: 2008
Serie B champion: 2001

External links
Official website

Ice hockey clubs established in 1962
Ice hockey teams in Italy
Inter-National League teams
1962 establishments in Italy
Sport in South Tyrol